Forge Crossing Halt railway station was a station in Titley, Herefordshire, England. The station, on the Presteigne Branch Line of the Leominster and Kington Railway, was opened in 1929 and closed in 1951.

References

Further reading

Disused railway stations in Herefordshire
Railway stations in Great Britain opened in 1929
Railway stations in Great Britain closed in 1951
Former Great Western Railway stations
1929 establishments in England
1951 disestablishments in England